In the inaugural edition of the tournament, Venus Williams won the title by defeating Justine Henin 6–3, 5–7, 6–3 in the final.

Seeds
The first four seeds received a bye into the second round.

Draw

Finals

Top half

Bottom half

External links
 Official results archive (ITF)
 Official results archive (WTA)

2002 Singles
Proximus Diamond Games
Proximus Diamond Games